This is a list of the tallest buildings in Pakistan, ranked by structural height.

The current tallest building in Pakistan is the Bahria Icon Tower in Karachi.

Most of Pakistan's tallest buildings can be found in its most populous city of Karachi, including;

 Habib Bank Plaza, built in 1963 in Karachi, was the first high-rise and the tallest building in Pakistan. It was also the tallest building in Asia from 1963 to 1968, and the tallest building in South Asia from 1963 to 1970. 
 Bahria Icon Tower surpassed them all in 2016.

Completed buildings (100m+)

This list ranks completed and topped out buildings that stand at least  or 20 floors, based on standard height measurement. This height includes spires and architectural details but does not include antenna masts. Existing partially habitable structures are included for ranking purposes based on present height. Karachi has the most completed highrise buildings in Pakistan, followed by Islamabad.

Under construction (100m+)
This list ranks buildings that are under construction in Pakistan and are planned to rise at least 100 m (330 ft) or 20 floors tall. Buildings under construction that have already been topped out are also included, as are those whose construction has been suspended. Karachi has the most under construction buildings followed by Islamabad.

On hold (100m+)
This table lists buildings that were at one time under construction in Pakistan and were expected to rise at least 100 meters (330 ft) in height, but are now on hold. While not officially cancelled, construction has been suspended on each development.

Proposed/vision (100m+)

This list ranks buildings in Pakistan that are approved or proposed and are planned to rise at least 100 m (330 ft).

Timeline of tallest buildings
This is a list of buildings that once held the title of tallest building in Pakistan.

Cities with buildings over 100 metres

See also

 List of tallest buildings in Karachi
 List of tallest buildings in Lahore
 List of tallest buildings in Islamabad
 List of tallest buildings and structures in South Asia
 List of tallest buildings and structures in Afghanistan
 List of tallest buildings in Asia
 List of tallest buildings in the world

References

 
Tallest
Pakistan
Pakistan